Archtober is a citywide celebration of architecture in New York City organized by the Center for Architecture. The festival's name is a portmanteau of architecture and October, the month in which it is celebrated.

The festival is known for its Building of the Day highlight, which provides a focus on a specific building or architect thereof, but also includes exhibits and other public programs that celebrate architecture and design.

See also
Open House New York

References

Festivals established in 2010
Festivals in New York City
Architecture festivals